Association Sportive Tanda, more commonly known as AS Tanda or just Tanda, is an Ivorian football club based in Tanda in the Gontougo Region.

They are a member of the Ivorian Football Federation Premiere Division.

Stadium
Currently the team plays at the 3000-capacity Stade Henri Konan Bédié.

League participations
Côte d'Ivoire Premier Division: 2013–present
Ligue 2 (Ivory Coast): ?–2013

Honours
Côte d'Ivoire Premier Division: 3
2014–15, 2015–16, 2016–17.

Côte d'Ivoire Cup: 0

Coupe de la Ligue de Côte d'Ivoire: 0

Coupe Houphouët-Boigny: 1
2016

Performance in CAF competitions
CAF Champions League: 0 appearance

CAF Confederation Cup: 0 appearance

CAF Super Cup: 0 appearance

Current squad

References

External links
Soccerway
Futbol24

Tanda
Tanda
Sport in Zanzan District
Gontougo